Ernest the Iron (1377 – 10 June 1424), a member of the House of Habsburg, ruled over the Inner Austrian duchies of Styria, Carinthia and Carniola from 1406 until his death. He was head of the Habsburg Leopoldian line from 1411.

Biography
Ernest was born in Bruck an der Mur in Styria, the third son of Duke Leopold III of Austria (1351–1386) and his consort Viridis Visconti (d. 1414), a daughter of Bernabò Visconti, Lord of Milan. Shortly after his birth, his father and his uncle Albert III divided the Habsburg lands by the 1379 Treaty of Neuberg: while Albert and his Albertinian descendants would rule over the Duchy of Austria proper, the Leopoldian line received the Inner Austrian states of Styria, Carinthia and Carniola with the remaining March of Istria, as well as Tyrol and the Further Austrian possessions. After Leopold's death in the 1386 Battle of Sempach, young Ernest and his brothers William, Leopold IV and Frederick IV remained under the guardianship of their uncle Albert III. 

In 1401 Ernest accompanied King Rupert of Germany on his campaign to Italy. When their elder brother William died in 1406, the remaining three sons of Leopold III agreed about the partition of their patrimony: In the separation agreement of 1406, Ernest received Styria, Carinthia and Carniola, and jointly with his elder brother Leopold IV (the current head of the Leopoldian line) held the guardianship over their minor nephew Albert V of Austria, grandson of Duke Albert III. Tyrol and Further Austria passed to the youngest brother Frederick IV.

In 1407, however, conflicts between Leopold and Ernest resulted in a civil war that lasted until May 1409. When Leopold died without male heirs in 1411, Ernest finally became the uncontested head of the Leopoldian branch. In 1414, he became the last Duke to be enthroned according to Carantanian traditional rite at the Prince's Stone in Carinthia, and from that time on called himself 'archduke'. He was the first Habsburg to actually use this title, which had been invented by his uncle Duke Rudolf IV.

Ernest was made a member of the Order of the Dragon and of the Equestrian Order of the Holy Sepulchre of Jerusalem in 1414, however, he became bitter with the Luxembourg king Sigismund from 1412 onwards. When his brother Frederick IV, a supporter of Antipope John XXIII at the Council of Constance, was banned by the king in 1417, Ernest first attempted to gain control over Frederick's territories himself, but then came to an agreement with him and successfully defended Tyrol against Sigismund's pretensions. Ernest turned out to be a capable ruler of the Inner Austrian lands; his eldest son Frederick V would become sole heir of all Habsburg lines, elected King of the Romans in 1440 and crowned Holy Roman Emperor in 1452.

Ernest died at Bruck an der Mur, and was buried in the Cistercian monastery of Rein near Graz. His nickname the Iron only came into use after his death.

Family and children

On 14 January 1392, Ernest married his first wife, Margaret of Pomerania. She was a daughter of the Griffin duke Bogislaw V of Pomerania and his second wife, Adelheid of Brunswick-Grubenhagen. They had no children. She died in either 1407 or 1410, according to contradictory necrologies. 

On 25 January 1412, Ernest married his second wife, the Piast princess Cymburgis of Masovia, who was his equal in vitality and with whom he had nine children:
 Frederick III, Holy Roman Emperor (21 September 1415 – 19 August 1493)
 Margaret of Austria (1416/17 – 12 February 1486), married on 3 June 1431 to Frederick II, Elector of Saxony
 Albert VI, Archduke of Austria (18 December 1418 – 2 December 1463)
 Alexander of Austria (died 1420)
 Rudolf of Austria (died before 1424)
 Catherine of Austria (1420 – 11 September 1493), married on 15 July 1447 to Charles I, Margrave of Baden-Baden
 Leopold of Austria (died before 1424)
 Anna of Austria (died 11 November 1429)
 Ernest of Austria (died 10 August 1432)
As the ruler of Inner Austria and founder of the older Styrian line of the Habsburgs, which, by their son, Frederick III survived the Albertinian (Austrian) and Tyrolean lines, Ernest and Cymburgis became the ancestors of all later emperors of the Habsburg monarchy.

Ancestors

External links

Entry in Aeiou Encyclopedia

1377 births
1424 deaths
15th-century dukes of Austria
Dukes of Styria
Dukes of Carinthia
Dukes of Carniola
People from Bruck an der Mur
Burials at Rein Abbey, Austria
Austrian people of Italian descent
Austrian people of German descent
Medieval Knights of the Holy Sepulchre